1934 Academy Awards may refer to:

 6th Academy Awards, the Academy Awards ceremony that took place in 1934
 7th Academy Awards, the 1935 ceremony honoring the best in film for 1934